Evans Owusu (born 8 September 1997) is a Ghanaian professional footballer who plays as defender for Liberty Professionals. He previously played for Kumasi Asante Kotoko.

Career 
Owusu started his career with Charity Stars playing for the club in the Ghana Division Two League. In August 2018, he secured a deal to Kumasi-based club Asante Kotoko. He immediately established himself as the club's starting left-back under then head coach C.K. Akunnor. He helped played 9 matches and scored a goal as they won the 2019 GFA Normalization Committee Special Competition and qualified for the 2019–20 CAF Champions League. He however lost his position to Ibrahim Imoro in the 2019–20 season and struggled to break into the starting line-up after the appointment of Maxwell Konadu. His contract with the club was terminated in September 2020 ahead of the 2020–21 season.

Owusu was one of four players who reported Kotoko to the Player Status Committee of the Ghana Football Association. At the end, the committee ruled in their favour and ordered the team to pay the player in excess of GH₵26,000 for non-payment of his transfer enticement fees and salaries.

On 18 February 2021, Owusu signed for Dansoman-based club Liberty Professionals, during the second transfer window period of the 2020–21 season. He made his debut on 24 February 2021, playing the full 90 minutes in a 1–0 loss to Hearts of Oak. On 16 April 2021, he scored his first competitive goal for the club, after scoring a screamer via an Abraham Wayo assist to help Liberty to a 1–1 draw against his former club Asante Kotoko. On 4 July 2021, he scored Liberty's winning goal in a 3–2 victory over Karela United.

Honours 
Asante Kotoko

 GFA Special Committee Competition: 2019

References

External links 

 

 

Living people
1997 births
Association football defenders
Ghanaian footballers
Asante Kotoko S.C. players
Liberty Professionals F.C. players
Ghana Premier League players
Charity Stars F.C. players